Nike (minor planet designation: 307 Nike) is a sizeable asteroid of the asteroid belt. It was discovered by Auguste Charlois on 5 March 1891 while working at the Nice Observatory. Charlois named it after the Greek goddess of victory, as well as the Greek name for the city where it was discovered. Measurement of the light curve of this asteroid in 2000 indicates a rotation period of 7.902 ± 0.005 hours.

On 2 December 1972, Pioneer 10 made one of its nearest passages of an asteroid when it passed 307 Nike at a distance of about 8.8 million kilometers (0.059 AU) during the spacecraft's pioneering trip through the asteroid belt. No data was collected.

References

External links 
 
 

000307
Discoveries by Auguste Charlois
Named minor planets
000307
18910305